Sde Trumot is a moshav in northern Israel.

The moshav is one of four moshavim in the "Bikurah" bloc.  The others are Revaya, Rechov, and Tel Teomim, which are all located nearby.

History
The village founded in 1951 by immigrants from the Jewish village of Sandur in Iraqi Kurdistan. The name "Sde Trumot" is based on the lamentation of David for Saul and Jonathan who were killed in a war against the Philistines on the nearby Mount Gilboa.  The lamentation is recorded in the first chapter of Samuel II.  The words "Sde Trumot", meaning "fields of offerings" (of grain), appear in Samuel II, chapter 1, verse 21. The new settlers wanted to restore these fruitful fields of grain offerings.

It is located on the land of the depopulated  Palestinian village of  Al-Samiriyya.

On 19 June 2003, a suicide attack in the moshav killed the storekeeper, Avner Mordechai.

In May 2017, the Jacob Sheep flock of Israel moved to Sdei Trumot after being imported from Canada. An educational/touristic venture is planned to preserve the animals.

Economy
The original inhabitants of the settlement worked in agriculture and cattle raising.  Today some of them perform modern agriculture using greenhouses and other technology.

References

Iraqi-Jewish culture in Israel
Kurdish-Jewish culture in Israel
Populated places established in 1951
Moshavim
Populated places in Northern District (Israel)
1951 establishments in Israel